HAT-P-3, is a metal-rich K5 dwarf star located about 441 light-years away in the constellation Ursa Major. At a magnitude of about 11.5 it is not visible to the naked eye but is visible in a small to medium-sized amateur telescope. It is believed to be a relatively young star and has a slightly enhanced level of chromospheric activity.

The star HAT-P-3 is named Dombay. The name was selected in the NameExoWorlds campaign by Russia, during the 100th anniversary of the IAU. Dombay is a resort region in the North Caucasus mountains.

Planetary system
This star is home to the extrasolar planet HAT-P-3b discovered by the HATNet Project using the transit method.

See also
 List of transiting extrasolar planets

References

External links
 

Ursa Major (constellation)
K-type main-sequence stars
Planetary transit variables
Planetary systems with one confirmed planet